Henry Snell may refer to:

Harry Snell, 1st Baron Snell (1865–1944), English politician 
Henry B. Snell (1858–1943), English-American painter
Henry Saxon Snell (1831–1904), English architect